Bhit or Bhit Shah is a small town located in Matiari District, Sindh, Pakistan. The town is best known as the location of the shrine to the Sindhi Sufi poet, Shah Abdul Latif Bhittai, who gave his name to the town (Bhttai ).

Passing along the road that leaves Haala for Hyderabad, beyond the shrubs there are a solitary group of large white mounds, which form hills known as Bhit in Sindhi.

Shrine of Abdul Latif Bhittai

The Shrine of Shah Abdul Latif Bhittai, located in the centre of town, was built by Mian Ghulam Shah Kalhoro, who ruled over Sindh during the late 1700s. Kalhoro ordered the shrine to be built in 1772. It is a structure covered with traditional Sindhi Kashi tiles, glazed in the colours such as blue and turquoise. The final resting place of Shah Latif is under the main-dome of the building. His grave is enclosed by a carved wooden screen and lies under a fresco.
Musicians are often seen serenading the constant trickle of devotees who visit the saint.
On Thursdays' evenings, locals gather around to remember the Sufi saint, by reciting his poems and playing music. The Urs of Shah Latif is celebrated in the Islamic month of Safar.

Museum
Located close to the shrine is the small Bhit Shah Museum which houses exhibits of folktales mentioned in Shah Abdul Latif Bhittai's best known work, Shah Jo Risalo. These include Sohni Mehar and Umar Marui.

Populated places in Sindh
Shah Abdul Latif Bhittai